Barium sulfide is the inorganic compound with the formula BaS.  BaS is the barium compound produced on the largest scale. It is an important precursor to other barium compounds including BaCO3 and the pigment lithopone, ZnS/BaSO4. Like other chalcogenides of the alkaline earth metals, BaS is a short wavelength emitter for electronic displays.  It is colorless, although like many sulfides, it is commonly obtained in impure colored forms.

Discovery, production and properties
BaS was prepared by the Italian alchemist Vincentius (or Vincentinus) Casciarolus (or Casciorolus, 1571–1624) via the thermo-chemical reduction of BaSO4 (available as the mineral barite). It is currently manufactured by an improved version of Casciarolus's process using coke in place of flour and charcoal. This kind of conversion is called a carbothermic reaction:

BaSO4  +  2 C  →  BaS  +  2 CO2
and also:
BaSO4  +  4 C  →  BaS  +  4 CO

The basic method remains in use today. BaS dissolves in water. These aqueous solutions, when treated with sodium carbonate or carbon dioxide, give a white solid of barium carbonate, a source material for many commercial barium compounds.

According to Harvey (1957), in 1603, Vincenzo Cascariolo used barite, found at the bottom of Mount Paterno near Bologna, in one of his non-fruitful attempts to produce gold. After grinding and heating the mineral with charcoal under reducing conditions, he obtained a persistent luminescent material rapidly called Lapis Boloniensis, or Bolognian stone. The phosphorescence of the material obtained by Casciarolo made it a curiosity.

BaS crystallizes with the NaCl structure, featuring octahedral Ba2+ and S2− centres.

The observed melting point of barium sulfide is highly sensitive to impurities.

Safety
BaS is quite poisonous, as are related sulfides, such as CaS, which evolve toxic hydrogen sulfide upon contact with water.

References

Barium compounds
Sulfides
Cubic minerals
Phosphors and scintillators
Rock salt crystal structure